Delminichthys krbavensis is a species of fish in the family Cyprinidae.
It is found only in Krbavsko Polje in Croatia, in a single karstic freshwater spring.
It has disappeared from stream habitats, and is threatened by further habitat loss.

Sources

 

Delminichthys
Endemic fauna of Croatia
Cyprinid fish of Europe
Fish described in 2002
Taxonomy articles created by Polbot